Trichodes flavocinctus is a beetle species of checkered beetles belonging to the family Cleridae, subfamily Clerinae. It was described by Maximilian Spinola in 1844 and can be found in France, Spain, Portugal, the island of Corsica, and North Africa.

References

flavocinctus
Beetles described in 1844
Beetles of Europe